Quercus praeco is a Mexican species of trees in the beech family. It is native to the States of Jalisco and Nayarit in western  Mexico and Nuevo León in northeastern Mexico.

The upper side of the leaves is green, the underside yellowish because of many hairs.

References

praeco
Endemic oaks of Mexico
Trees of Jalisco
Trees of Nayarit
Trees of Nuevo León
Least concern flora of North America
Plants described in 1924
Taxonomy articles created by Polbot
Taxa named by William Trelease